The gastropod genus Aurinia is nowadays usually considered a junior synonym of Scaphella.Aurinia is a genus of flowering plants of the family Brassicaceae (Cruciferae), native to mountainous areas of Central and Southern Europe, Russia and Turkey. They are closely related to Alyssum, which they resemble. They can either be biennial or woody-based evergreen perennials.  They produce panicles of yellow flowers in early summer.Aurinia contains the following species accepted by The Plant List:Aurinia corymbosa Griseb.Aurinia cyclocarpa (Boiss.) Czerep.Aurinia gionae (Quézel & Contandr.) Greuter & BurdetAurinia leucadea (Guss.) K.KochAurinia moreana Tzanoud. & IatroúAurinia petraea (Ard.) SchurAurinia rupestris (Sweet) Cullen & T.R.DudleyAurinia saxatilis (L.) Desv.Aurinia sinuata (L.) Griseb.Aurinia uechtritziana'' (Bornm.) Cullen & T.R.Dudley

References

External links

Brassicaceae
Brassicaceae genera